Aznalkino (Aźnalı) is a rural locality (a selo) in Azikeyevsky Selsoviet, Beloretsky District, Bashkortostan, Russia. The population was 415 as of 2010. There are 10 streets.

Geography 
Aznalkino is located 20 km southwest of Beloretsk (the district's administrative centre) by road. Azikeyevo is the nearest rural locality.

References 

Rural localities in Beloretsky District